"Roly Poly" is a humorous Western swing standard written by Fred Rose in 1946. In the song, Roly Poly is a very active boy who eats continuously to keep his strength up. Each verse ends with:

"Roly Poly" was first recorded by Bob Wills and His Texas Playboys in 1946, staying on the charts for 18 weeks and reaching number three. It has been recorded by many Western swing bands since. Notable renditions have been recorded by fellow Texans, country crooners Jim Reeves and Ray Price.  Asleep at the Wheel featuring The Chicks covered the song in 2000. The version was not a single, but charted as an album cut peaking at number 65.  The Little Willies covered the song on their 2006 self-titled album.

Chuck Berry's "Roly Poly" is a different song, as is the 1952 Ray Charles/Rufus Beacham Orchestra instrumental "Roly Poly" (which may not even be Ray Charles).

Citations

References
Whitburn, Joel. The Billboard Book of Top 40 Country Hits. Billboard Books, 2006. 

Western swing songs
1946 songs
Bob Wills songs
Asleep at the Wheel songs
The Chicks songs
Songs written by Fred Rose (songwriter)